Hieroglyphus annulicornis is a species of short-horned grasshopper in the family Acrididae. It is found in India and southeastern Asia.

References

External links

 

Acrididae